Tiina Trutsi (born 19 February 1994) is an Estonian footballer, who plays as a midfielder for Cypriot team Barcelona FA and the Estonian national team.

Career
She made her debut for the Estonia women's national football team on 8 June 2012 against Lithuania and has since been capped 20 times.

In June 2018 she joined Cypriot champion Barcelona FA.

Honours
Young Female Player of the Year 2012.

References

External links
 
 
 

1994 births
Living people
Estonian women's footballers
Estonia women's international footballers
South Alabama Jaguars women's soccer players
Women's association football midfielders
Estonian expatriate footballers
Expatriate women's footballers in Cyprus
Expatriate women's soccer players in the United States
Estonian expatriate sportspeople in the United States
Estonian expatriate sportspeople in Cyprus
Barcelona FA players
FC Flora (women) players